Ievgeniia Gubkina (born 7 May 1985) is a Ukrainian architect and architectural historian specializing in architecture and urban planning of the 20th century in Ukraine, and a multidisciplinary approach to heritage studies. Since 2014 she has co-founded the NGO Urban Forms Center and the avant-garde women's movement "Modernistki".

Life and career

Ievgeniia Gubkina was born in Kharkiv in a family of architects. In 2008 she graduated with honors from the Faculty of Architecture of the Kharkiv National Academy of Urban Economy with a degree in urban planning. From 2008 to 2011 she studied in its PhD program Theory of Architecture and Restoration of Architectural Monuments.

From 2006 to 2008 she worked as an architect in OJSC "Kharkiv Design Institute".

In 2014 she co-founded the NGO Urban Forms Center, starting her involvement in activism in architecture and heritage preservation.

From 2015 to 2018 Gubkina was a researcher at the Center for Urban History of East Central Europe in Lviv. She launched and supervised the development of the very first architectural and interdisciplinary summer schools in Ukraine, in particular, "New Lviv" in Lviv (2015) and "The Idea of the City: Reality Check" in Slavutych (2016)

Her first book, Slavutych: Architectural Guide, was published in 2015 by DOM publishers in Germany and was dedicated to the architecture of the last Soviet city of Slavutych, built after the Chornobyl disaster for workers of the Chornobyl Nuclear Power Plant. In 2019, after many years of research, her second book, Soviet Modernism. Brutalism. Post-Modernism. Buildings and Structures in Ukraine 1955–1991, was published by Osnovy Publishing and DOM. The book was published in English and included photographs from all over Ukraine of the most stunning objects of Soviet-Ukrainian architecture of the second half of the 20th century.

In 2020, Gubkina curated Encyclopedia of Ukrainian Architecture, a multimedia online project that worked with architecture, history, criticism, cinema and visual arts. Through various media tools it demonstrates the panorama of Ukrainian architecture, analyzing how society and architecture shape each other.

In 2021, she became an author and screenwriter of the audiovisual project "Ukrainian Constructivism", created at the intersection of contemporary visual art, ballet, electro-folk music, and historical drama. The project involved Ukrainian musicians Nata Zhyzhchenko (Onuka) and Yevhen Filatov (the Maneken), Ukrainian-Danish artist and architect Sergei Sviatchenko, and Danish choreographer Sebastian Kloborg. The project is based on the true story of Lotte Stam-Beese, a young German modernist architect from the Bauhaus school, who lived and worked in Kharkiv in the early 1930s.

Regularly publishing scientific and journalistic articles in Ukrainian and foreign magazines and online media (The Calvert Journal, Springerin, RGOW, Obieg, ERA21), in 2021 she became a columnist for L'Officiel Hommes Ukraine, publishing articles on architecture and interviews with famous architects.

Selected publications

 Slavutych: Architectural Guide. Berlin: DOM publishers, 2015. 
 Soviet Modernism. Brutalism. Post-Modernism. Buildings and Structures in Ukraine 1955–1991. Berlin: DOM publishers, 2019 (with Alex Bykov). 
 Bauhaus – Zaporizhzhia. Zaporizhzhia Modernism and Bauhaus School: Universality of Phenomena. Problems of Preserving Modernist Heritage. Kharkiv: Urban Forms Center, 2018 (ed.).

References

External links
 Ievgeniia Gubkina's publications at Academia.edu
 NGO Urban Forms Center
 Encyclopedia of Ukrainian Architecture
 Ukrainian Constructivism

1985 births
Kharkiv National Academy of Urban Economy alumni
Living people
People from Kharkiv
Ukrainian architecture writers
Ukrainian women architects